Ousmane Tounkara (born December 25, 1973) is a former Canadian football wide receiver who played three seasons with the Saskatchewan Roughriders of the Canadian Football League (CFL). He was drafted by the Roughriders in the second round of the 1998 CFL Draft. He played CIS football at the University of Ottawa. Tounkara's brother Ibrahim also played in the CFL.

Professional career
Tounkara signed with the Washington Redskins of the National Football League on April 23, 1998. He was released by the Redskins on August 25, 1998. He was selected by the Saskatchewan Roughriders of the CFL in the second round of the 1998 CFL Draft and played in 29 games for the team from 1998 to 2000.

References

External links
Just Sports Stats

Living people
1973 births
Canadian football wide receivers
American football wide receivers
Canadian players of American football
Ottawa Gee-Gees football players
Washington Redskins players
Saskatchewan Roughriders players
Sportspeople from Warsaw
University of Ottawa alumni